Mungra Medical Centre (Dutch: Mungra Medisch Centrum or MMC) is a hospital in Nieuw-Nickerie, Suriname. It was the first hospital in Suriname outside of Paramaribo.

History 
On 31 March 1907, the government set up a commission to upgrade the infirmary in Nickerie to a hospital. This became known as the 's Lands Ziekenhuis Nickerie, which was located in Margarethenburg, not too far from Nieuw-Nickerie. Due to its remote location, small size and problems with flooding, it was decided in the 1950s to close it and open a new hospital on the Annastraat in Nieuw-Nickerie. The first stone was laid on 25 July 1956 and the hospital was eventually opened on 15 January 1959.

On 7 March 1994, the hospital was named Lachmipersad Mungra Regional Hospital Nickerie after Lachmipersad Mungra, a physician and member of parliament from Nickerie. On 25 May 2017, the hospital was renamed to Mungra Medical Centre. On 8 December 2017, the MMC together with the Ministry of Defence will be setting up five outpatient clinics in Kalebaskreek, Donderskamp, Corneliskondre, and Kabalebo.

Services
The hospital specializes in gynecology, surgery, internal medicine, pediatrics, radiology, urology, psychology, otorhinolaryngology. The patient will be referred to Paramaribo for ophthalmology, orthopedic surgery, dermatology, psychiatry, and neurology.

References

Hospitals in Suriname
Buildings and structures in Nieuw Nickerie
Hospitals established in 1959
1959 establishments in Suriname